Bradford Airport may refer to:

Bradford Aerodrome, serving Bradford, Ontario, Canada (IATA: YFD)
Bradford County Airport, serving Towanda and Bradford County, Pennsylvania, United States (FAA: N27)
Bradford Regional Airport, serving Bradford and McKean County, Pennsylvania, United States (IATA: BFD)
Leeds Bradford Airport, serving Leeds and Bradford in West Yorkshire, England (IATA: LBA)

See also 
 Bradford Field (disambiguation)